Yang Gil (hangul: 양길; hanja: 梁吉) was a head of rebel forces in Silla. Hugoguryeo King Gung Ye was once under his command. Historians are uncertain about his birth, death or family line. At the time, the monarch of Silla was Queen Jinseong. In 889, the state coffers of Silla were empty, so the queen sent envoys to the provinces to press her subjects into paying taxes. As a result, rebel forces began uprising all over the country, and Yang Gil was their major driving force. The extent of Yang Gil's power is uncertain, but it is thought to have been considerable given the fact that Gung Ye was among his men. Yang Gil had the favor of Gung Ye, so Yang Gil entrusted him with all his work, gave him his soldiers and sent him on a military expedition eastward. According to the Samguk Sagi, Gung Ye's army's strength reached about 600 men, who are believed to have been soldiers given to him by Yang Gil. Once Gung Ye's power had increased, he left Yang Gil's army and founded the Hugoguryeo nation. In retribution, Yang Gil tried to attack him, but failed. Little is known of Yang Gil's fate after this.

References 

 Yang Gil Global Encyclopedia / Daum

Silla people